Alte Oder is a branch on the river Oder in Brandenburg, Germany, where it drains the Oderbruch basin, flowing northwards to the confluence with the Oder near Hohensaaten. It is one of several branches of the Oder named "Alte Oder".

See also
List of rivers of Brandenburg

Rivers of Brandenburg
Federal waterways in Germany
0Alte Oder
Rivers of Germany